Zoran Đorđević (born Valjevo, 7 November 1962) is  film, television and theater director, screenwriter, art photographer and producer.

Biography
Đorđević graduated from the Documentary Film department at FAMU, Film and TV School of the Academy of Arts in Prague.

Đorđević has made more than twenty films in Yugoslavia / Serbia, Czech Republic, Brazil, Angola, and other countries. Among other things, he is a laureate of the Yugoslav Documentary and Short Film Festival (today's Martovski festival) for the films Prayer for Dead Souls, Odyssey, and Cheers.

From the second half of the 1990s Đorđević lived and worked mostly in Brazil, where his films are regularly shown at festivals.

In addition to film and theater making, he is also engaged with film and photographic pedagogy - at lectures for the Film Foundation in São José dos Campos, as well as other workshops and courses.

Selected filmography 
 2017 Na gota colorida encontra-se uma vida
 2013 O Saber e Fazer
 2011 Memórias Caiçaras
 2007 Nkisi na Diáspora: Raízes Religiosas Bantu no Brasil
 2000 Ilhados
 2000 Por Quem Os Sinos Dobram
 1999 Živeli
 1997 Dan kad smo svi gledali u nebo / O dia em que olhamos para o céu
 1995 Odiseja
 1995 Nostalgični koncert za violinu
 1993 Molitva za mrtve duše
 1992 Nestao
 1987 Pozdravi sve koji pitaju za mene

Selected theatrography 
 1999 The Wizard of Oz (Čarobnjak iz Oza), Valjevo
 1987 An island story (Ostrvska priča), Valjevo

References

External links 
  
 Official YouTube Chanel
 Jutarnji program: Zoran Đorđević (an interview), Televizija Valjevo Plus, 30 May 2017. 

1962 births
People from Valjevo
Yugoslav film directors
Serbian film producers
Serbian film directors
Serbian screenwriters
Male screenwriters
Serbian photographers
American people of Serbian descent
Living people
Brazilian film directors
Brazilian documentary filmmakers
Brazilian film producers
Brazilian screenwriters
Brazilian theatre directors
Serbian theatre directors
Brazilian photographers